The Theta Tau Educational Foundation was established by the Theta Tau Executive Council.  The council determined this would enable members of the fraternity to work together in support of those who have the skills and discipline to create technical marvels; those who are best able to solve complex problems of critical importance to our planet; those leaders, coordinators, organizers who effectively work with others; those who have a solid ethical foundation that serves them well in making the important decisions required of those with responsibility.

With the assistance of the foundation, Theta Tau chapters are being recognized on their campuses for helping recruit high school students for the engineering school; welcoming and orienting new students to their campus; leading engineering or university student government and other organizations; tutoring underclassmen in core subjects; helping instructors with research projects; working with administrators, faculty, and other student groups to further the educational mission of the engineering school; setting high standards of scholarship and academic achievement for others to follow.

The Theta Tau Educational Foundation can achieve all this and more. The foundation promotes education and training for leadership, teamwork, professionalism, responsibility, decision-making skills, and development of others.

General information

Foundation History
In 1998, the Theta Tau Executive Council determined that the establishment of the Theta Tau Educational Foundation would enable members of the Fraternity to work together in support of those who have the skills and discipline to create technical marvels; those who are best able to solve complex problems of critical importance to our planet; those leaders, coordinators, organizers who effectively work with others; those who have a solid ethical foundation that serves them well in making the important decisions required of those with responsibility.

The Foundation sponsored the Fraternity’s first Leadership Academy in 1999 replacing the National Conferences held in odd-numbered years since 1983.

The Foundation created the Second Century Society in the summer of 2001 to recognize those alumni who remember Theta Tau in their estate plans. In 2004, the Theta Tau Educational Foundation endowed its first named/permanent fund in honor of George P. Kalv, Gamma Beta ’47. In 2007, the Iota Beta permanent fund was established by the Theta Tau Educational Foundation as a result of the sale of the Iota Beta chapter house on McNichols in Detroit. In 2008, the Simon Ramo, Lambda '33, scholarship fund was established followed in 2010 by the Robert L. Miller, Οmicron '41, and William S. Johnson, Rho '42, scholarship funds.

In addition to scholarships, the Educational Foundation has graduated over 1,000 student members from its signature leadership academy training based on the Kouzes-Posner The Leadership Challenge model.

Accomplishments of the Foundation
To provide student scholarships (including named, memorial, academic, need-based, or based on other desirable characteristics)
Host a biannual, high-quality Theta Tau National Leadership Conference encouraging high attendance of student members from every chapter
Encourage excellence through the continued operation of the Theta Tau Alumni Hall of Fame
To increase availability of housing loans for chapters and their house corporations
Assist chapters that desire to make educational improvements to their chapter houses

As the Foundation resources grow
Traveling National Leadership Trainers will visit chapters enabling more students to gain through participation in presentations, workshops, and projects to develop their professional and leadership capabilities
Attendance at the National Leadership Conference will be made more affordable for all student members through Foundation financial support
Use of Foundation funding for nationally recognized "outside" speakers and for "named" lecture series

Programs

Leadership Academy
In 1999, the Theta Tau Educational Foundation established the Theta Tau Leadership Academy as a highly interactive program, built on The Leadership Challenge model by Kouzes and Posner, which provides participants a core understanding of leadership practices, their personal strengths and weaknesses, and a fun environment to practice new skills so they can more effectively transform their chapters and workplaces.

Scholarship Program
The Theta Tau Educational Foundation Scholarship Program has been established and regularly awards scholarships to student members of Theta Tau to enable them to continue their engineering education. The recipients are selected on the basis of their academic achievements, their participation in campus and community activities, and/or on financial need. Theta Tau's goals of assisting our Brothers and recognizing and fostering high academic achievement among members is strengthened through this program.

Board of directors

Student societies in the United States